Lieutenant-General Kenneth R. Pennie, CMM, CD, Ph.D (born c. 1949) is a retired Canadian Air Force general.  He was Chief of the Air Staff from 2003 to 2005.

Career
Pennie joined the Royal Canadian Air Force in 1966 and graduated from the Royal Military College of Canada in 1970. He served as Commanding Officer of 403 Helicopter Operational Training Squadron and then became Deputy Commander of 10 Tactical Air Group in 1990, Deputy Chief of Staff, Plans and Requirements in 1993 and Commander of 10 Tactical Air Group in 1995. He went on to be Director Force Planning and Program Coordination at National Defence Headquarters in 1997, Director General Strategic Planning at National Defence Headquarters in 1998 and Deputy Commander of NORAD in 2001, seeing intense activity in that role during the September 11 attacks, before becoming Chief of the Air Staff in 2003 and retiring in 2005.

Notes

References

|-

|-

Canadian Forces Air Command generals
People associated with the September 11 attacks
Living people
Canadian military personnel from Manitoba
Commanders of the Order of Military Merit (Canada)
Year of birth missing (living people)